"Everything I Wanted" is a song by band The Bangles. The song, with lead vocals by Susanna Hoffs, had been recorded for the band's 1988 album Everything but did not make the final track listing. It was co-written by Susanna Hoffs with Eric Lowen and Dan Navarro of Lowen & Navarro and features a barbershop quartet-style a capella bridge.

The Bangles broke up in late 1989, and a Greatest Hits album was released in 1990 to fulfill the band's contractual obligations with Columbia Records. Everything I Wanted was added to the release, where it was its sole new recording, and was released as a single to promote the album in continental Europe and Australia. In the UK, a new remix of "Walk Like an Egyptian" was released instead.

With the band no longer operative, the single relied solely on radio play and its music video for promotion and performed poorly on the charts, only charting in the Netherlands at number 41 in July 1990. This would be the band's last official single for 13 years.

Music video
A music video was created for the song, which consisted of an amalgamation of different shots from the band's earlier videos for Columbia Records.

Charts

References

1990 singles
The Bangles songs
Columbia Records singles
1990 songs
Songs written by Dan Navarro
Songs written by Susanna Hoffs
Songs written by Eric Lowen